Jakhama is a Southern Angami  Naga village located 18 km south of Kohima, the capital of Nagaland. It hosts the St. Joseph's College, Jakhama.

Demographics
Jakhama is located in Jakhama Circle of Kohima District, Nagaland with total 953 families residing. The Jakhama has a population of 5216 of which 3576 are males while 1640 are females as per Population Census 2011.

See also
Southern Angami
Angami Naga
Chakhesang Naga

References

Cities and towns in Kohima district